Ann-Christin "Ankie" Bagger (born 30 September 1964) is a Swedish disco/pop musician and singer who first garnered attention in 1988 with her cover of Herreys' "Varje liten droppe regn" as "People Say It's in the Air." She is one of the solo artists that benefited from the works of Swedish hit composer/producer trio Norell Oson Bard.

Album discography 

Where Were You Last Night (1989) (#13 in Sweden)
From the Heart (1993) (#50 in Sweden)
Flashback (1995)

Singles discography 

"People Say It's in the Air" (1988)
"I Was Made for Lovin' You" (1989)
"Where Were You Last Night" (1989)
"Love Really Hurts Without You" (1990)
"Fire and Rain" (1990)
"Happy, Happy Year for Us All" (With The Sylvesters) (1990)
"If You're Alone Tonight" (1991)
"Every Day Every Hour" (1992)
"Bang Bang" (1993)
"Where Is Love?" (1993)
"The Way I Dream About You" (1993)
"You Can't Buy My Love" (2009)
"Because It's Christmas" (2011)
"Du kan inte lura mig" (Peter Gustafson feat. Ankie Bagger)

References 

Swedish women singers
1964 births
Living people
English-language singers from Sweden
Swedish pop singers
Sonet Records artists